This article consists of various statistical charts related to the ongoing COVID-19 pandemic in Chile.

Daily report 
The following table includes the data reported daily by the Ministry of Health, based on the information available at 21:00 the day before the report is released.

On 9 June 2020, the Ministry of Health announced a new process to count the number of fatalities, based on the data recorded by the Civil Registry and Identification Service the day before. That method was changed again on 17 July; from that day, the deaths were counted using the data from the Department of Statistics and Health Information (DEIS) of the Ministry of Health. Due to the process of detection of deaths, the daily reports included deaths from several days prior, creating a gap between the date of report and the official date of death.

A graphic with the active cases as shown on the official data page of the Ministry, which are based on retroactively adjusted information rather than on daily reports, is also displayed.

Charts

Cases

Deaths 

<div style="overflow-x:auto;">

Medical care situation 

 Auto detect text files and perform LF normalization
 text=auto
@ -0,0 +1,7 @@
{
  "ExpandedNodes": [
    ""
  ],
  "SelectedNode": "\\hooks",
  "PreviewInSolutionExplorer": false
}

Daily progress of cases

Vaccination program 

Types of vaccines used (percentage of the total doses applied)

Distribution per region

Summary 
 Confirmed cases and PCR+ deaths, updated as of 15 October 2021.
 All COVID-19 related deaths (including suspected deaths without PCR+), updated as of 11 October 2021.

Cases by day

Charts 
For these charts, the regions of Chile has been grouped as:
 North: Arica and Parinacota, Tarapacá, Antofagasta, Atacama and Coquimbo regions.
 Center: Valparaíso, O'Higgins, Maule and Ñuble regions.
 Metropolitan: Santiago Metropolitan Region.
 South: Biobío, Araucanía, Los Ríos and Los Lagos regions.
 Extreme South: Aysén and Magallanes and Chilean Antarctica regions.

Distribution per commune

Summary

Notes

References

COVID-19 pandemic in Chile
Chile